Antti Agathon Tulenheimo (4 December 1879 – 3 September 1952) was a Finnish politician from the National Coalition Party who served as Prime Minister of Finland in 1925. 

He was also minister of the interior from November 1918 to April 1919. He was also mayor of Helsinki between 1931–1944 and rector of the University of Helsinki 1926–1930.

Cabinets
 Tulenheimo Cabinet

References

External links
 

1879 births
1952 deaths
People from Kangasala
People from Häme Province (Grand Duchy of Finland)
Finnish Party politicians
National Coalition Party politicians
Finnish senators
Prime Ministers of Finland
Ministers of the Interior of Finland
Members of the Parliament of Finland (1913–16)
Members of the Parliament of Finland (1922–24)
Members of the Parliament of Finland (1930–33)
Mayors of Helsinki
Academic staff of the University of Helsinki
Rectors of the University of Helsinki